Moses is a 1995 internationally produced Biblical drama television miniseries. It was directed by Roger Young, written by Lionel Chetwynd and starred Ben Kingsley, Frank Langella and Christopher Lee. Moses was filmed in Morocco and was aired in the United States on the TNT Network and internationally on the Trinity Broadcasting Network. The film is a part of TNT's Bible Collection.

Plot
Moses, an Israelite raised by the Egyptian royal family, is chosen by God to release the Hebrew people from slavery and lead them to the Promised Land. Based on the biblical story.

Cast 
 Ben Kingsley – Moses
 Frank Langella – Merneptah
 Christopher Lee – Pharaoh
 Anton Lesser – Eliav
 Philip Stone – Jethro
 Anna Galiena – Ptira
 David Suchet – Aaron
 Geraldine McEwan – Miriam
 Anthony Higgins – Korah
 Enrico Lo Verso – Joshua
 Maurice Roëves – Zerack
 Sônia Braga –Zipporah (uncredited)
 Vincent Riotta – Midan

Reception
Peter T. Chattaway from Patheos gave Moses a good review and praised Kingsley's performance: "For sheer human realism, Kingsley’s is probably the best interpretation of Moses any film has offered to date."

Moses was nominated for a Primetime Emmy Award in the category of "Outstanding Miniseries".

See also 
 Moses the Lawgiver

References

External links 
 

1995 films
Films directed by Roger Young
Films set in ancient Egypt
1995 drama films
TNT Network original films
Films based on the Book of Exodus
Bible Collection
Das Erste original programming
Portrayals of Moses in film
MTM Enterprises films
American drama television films
1990s English-language films
1990s American films